The 2008 Dominican Republic Volleyball League was the 2nd official season of the event. The SEDEFIR Cup was dedicated to Daniel Toribio. Distrito Nacional's team won their second title in both genders.

Teams

Women's
 Distrito Nacional
 Santiago
 San Juan
 San Cristóbal
 La Romana
 Santo Domingo
 Espaillat
 San Pedro de Macorís

Men's
 Bahoruco
 Barahona
 Distrito Nacional
 Espaillat
 La Romana
 Monte Plata
 Sánchez Ramírez
 Santo Domingo

Men's tournament

Preliminary round

Zone 1/ Group A

|}

Zone 2/ Group B

|}

Final round

Semifinals

|}
Source:

3rd place match

|}

Final

|}

Final standing

Awards
 Most Valuable Player
 Amaury Martínez (Distrito Nacional)

Women's tournament

Preliminary round

Zone 3/ Group A

|}

Zone 4/ Group B

|}

Final round

Semifinals

|}

3rd place match

|}

Final

|}

Final standing

Awards

 Most Valuable Player
 Jeoselyna Rodríguez (Distrito Nacional)
 Best Scorer
 Lisvel Elisa Eve (Santiago)
 Best Spiker
 Nuris Arias (Distrito Nacional)
 Best Blocker
 Lisvel Elisa Eve (Santiago)
 Best Server
 Cosiri Rodríguez (San Cristóbal)

 Best Digger
 Brenda Castillo (San Cristóbal)
 Best Setter
 Karla Echenique (Santiago)
 Best Receiver
 Brenda Castillo San Cristóbal
 Best Libero
 Carmen Rosa Caso Distrito Nacional

References

External links
 League Results

DOM